Chris Watts (born June 16, 1965), is an American inventor, businessman, filmmaker, and visual effects supervisor.

Biography
Currently president of Bake Visual Effects, Inc. located in Los Angeles, California, Watts began his film career with Dream Quest Images in 1989. Watts originated and implemented the digital intermediate process in 1995 when filming the New Line Cinema feature Pleasantville (1998).

Later in 2004, he pioneered the use of digital still cameras as a high resolution replacement for film cameras on Tim Burton's stop motion animated movie Corpse Bride. Watts gained wide recognition with the 2007 box office hit 300, a Warner Bros. action film adapted from the graphic novel of the same name by writer-artist Frank Miller of Dark Horse Comics.

He later went on supervising the 2009 fantasy film Where the Wild Things Are.

Filmography

Short films
 Five Shorts (2000) – co-writer and producer (directed by Billy Kent)
 In the Wall (2007) – Visual effects supervisor

Music videos
 Backstreet Boys – "Larger than Life" (directed by Joseph Kahn)
 Britney Spears – "Toxic" (directed by Joseph Kahn)
 Britney Spears – "Womanizer" (directed by Joseph Kahn)
 D12 – "Purple Hills" (directed by Joseph Kahn)
 DMX – "Who We Be" (directed by Joseph Kahn)
 DMX "X Gon' Give It to Ya" (directed by Joseph Kahn)
 Eminem – "We Made You" (directed by Joseph Kahn)
 Enrique Iglesias – "Hero" (directed by Joseph Kahn)
 Fiona Apple – "Across the Universe" (directed by Paul Thomas Anderson)
 Garbage – "Cherry Lips" (directed by Joseph Kahn)
 Katy Perry – "Waking Up in Vegas" (directed by Joseph Kahn)
 The Offspring – "Can't Get My Head Around You" (directed by Joseph Kahn)
 Papa Roach – "Between Angels and Insects" (directed by Joseph Kahn)
 The Pussycat Dolls – "I Hate This Part" (directed by Joseph Kahn)
 U2 – "Stuck in a Moment" (directed by Joseph Kahn)
 U2 "Elevation" (directed by Joseph Kahn)
 Wu Tang Clan – "Gravel Pit" (directed by Joseph Kahn)

Commercials
2004 – Coca-Cola x World of Warcraft x S.H.E
2005 – Sherwin-Williams Company
2008 – Clear
2008 – Sears
2009 – Deichmann Shoes
2009 – PokerStars (post-supervision; cameo)

Awards and nominations
 2001 – MTV Video Music Awards/(VMAs) – Best Visual Effects in U2's "Elevation" (nominated)
 2004 – Visual Effects Society – Outstanding Visual Effects in a Music Video for Britney Spears' "Toxic" (won)
 2007 – Satellite Award – Best Visual Effects for 300 (2006) (won)
 2008 – Visual Effects Society – Best Single Visual Effect of the Year in 300 (2006) (nominated)
 2008 – Saturn Award – Best Special Effects in 300 (2006) (nominated)

Publications
2011 – Eurographics, Comprehensive Facial Performance Capture

Press
 What to Expect at FMX by Studio Daily

References

External links 

 Bake Visual Effects, Inc. Official Website
 

Visual effects supervisors
Visual effects artists
Special effects people
Computer graphics professionals
1965 births
Living people